Marcus Sebastian Smith (born 14 February 1999) is an English professional rugby union player who primarily plays fly-half for Harlequins in the Gallagher Premiership. He has also represented England at international level, having made his test debut against the United States during the 2021 Summer Internationals.

Background
Born in the Philippines to a British father and a Filipina mother, Smith started playing rugby union at the age of seven for Centaurs RFC when his family moved to Singapore. He moved to the United Kingdom at the age of thirteen and subsequently received a sports scholarship to attend Brighton College, where he captained the school's 1st XV. The young fly-half was named Player of the Tournament at the 2016 St Joseph's Rugby Festival.

Club career

Developmental
The fly-half first represented Harlequins at the 2016 Premiership Rugby Sevens Series.

During the 2016–17 season, as part of the Harlequin Elite Player Development Group (EPDG), Smith played five fixtures for the Harlequin U18s Academy side, scoring two tries; one each against London Irish and Saracens and contributing ten points from the tee in Harlequins U18s Academy Final win over Sale Sharks U18s.

In March 2017, Smith was promoted from the EPDG up to the full-time Academy starting in June.

Smith was named in the 12-man senior squad, alongside another Brighton College graduate Calum Waters, for the 2017 Singha Premiership Rugby Sevens at Franklin's Gardens. Smith scored two tries against London Irish on the first day and assisted Harlequins in reaching the club semi-final before losing out to Newcastle Falcons.

Premiership
On 2 September 2017 Smith made his professional debut wearing the number 10 jersey for the senior Harlequins side in the Premiership Rugby London Double Header fixture against London Irish at Twickenham Stadium. Two weeks later, Smith gave a Man-of-the-Match performance against Wasps, helping to end the home side's 20-match winning streak at Ricoh Arena.

He started in the Premiership final against Exeter Chiefs on 26 June 2021 as Harlequins won the game 40–38 in the highest scoring Premiership final ever, which included four conversions from Smith's boot.

Heineken Champions Cup
In the Heineken Champions Cup match between Harlequins and Castres Olympique on 21/01/22, Smith scored the final conversion after Alex Dombrandt scored the final try, giving Harlequins a win of 36 to 33.

International career

Youth squads
Smith started his first England appearance with a try in an under-16s match victory against Wales in April 2015. In February 2017 Smith represented the England under-20 team against Italy in the 2017 Six Nations Under 20s Championship and then in April 2017 scored a try for the England under-18 team against Ireland.

In May 2017, Smith took part in a training session with the elite senior England squad, during their 3-day camp at Brighton College, in preparation for the Old Mutual Wealth Cup match against the Barbarians and their summer tour to Argentina.

In July 2017 Smith was named in the England U18s squad for a tour of South Africa in August but was withdrawn prior to the tour and instead on 3 August 2017 Smith was named in Eddie Jones' pre-season senior England training squad. Eddie Jones described Smith's inclusion in the senior squad as part of the plan to develop young players as well as to give pressure on experienced players such as Owen Farrell and George Ford.

On 22 September 2017, Smith was named in the 33-man England training squad for a camp in Oxford ahead of the Autumn internationals, although England coach Eddie Jones said he would be "treated like an apprentice". In the following month on 26 October, Smith was called into the England squad for the Autumn international series. He was also part of the training squad during the 2018 Six Nations Championship.

Smith was named in the England U20 squad for the 2018 World Rugby Under 20 Championship in France and scored tries in pool games against Argentina and Italy. He started at fly-half for the semi-final against South Africa and defeat in the final against France as England finished runners up to the hosts. Smith declined selection for the 2019 World Rugby Under 20 Championship.

England senior team
After declining to join the 2019 U-20 team, Smith instead made his non-capped England debut on 2 June 2019 against the Barbarians. During the game, Smith contributed 26 points, including a try towards a 51–43 victory for England and was awarded Man-of-the-Match for his performance.

On 4 July 2021, Smith made his full England test debut against the United States, contributing 13 points, including a try, in a 43–29 victory. He earned his second start against Canada six days later, with a faultless kicking display in a 70–14 win for England.

In the 2021 Autumn rugby union internationals Smith scored a try as a second-half replacement against Tonga on 6th November, and kicked five conversions. He started the match against Australia the following week as fly-half but often stood outside Owen Farrell until Farrell went off injured in the second half. He played a full match at fly-half against South Africa on 20th November, kicking three conversions and two penalties, one in the last minute to give England the victory by a single point.

England's 2022 Six Nations season opened with the Calcutta Cup fixture away at Murrayfield in Edinburgh on 5 February. In the absence of Owen Farrell through injury and George Ford not in the original squad, Smith started at number 10 and his performance was highly praised. However many were surprised that, despite this and England's early dominance, coach Eddie Jones decided to replace Smith after 60 minutes despite scoring a try and four successful kicks. In the subsequent Six Nations game against Italy Smith played for the full 80 minutes and scored England's first try and was awarded Man of the Match, an accolade he was again awarded in their next game against Wales. Smith was the highest point scorer for the 2022 Six Nations Championship.

British and Irish Lions
On 10 July, Smith was called up to the 2021 British and Irish Lions squad as injury cover for Finn Russell.
On 17 July, Smith made his British and Irish Lions debut, playing at fly-half for the full 80 minutes against the Stormers. He converted all 7 tries successfully for a 49–3 win for the Lions.

International tries

References

External links

 RFU profile
 Harlequins profile
 Marcus Smith | Rugby Database Profile

1999 births
Living people
English rugby union players
England international rugby union players
Harlequin F.C. players
Rugby union fly-halves
People educated at Brighton College
English people of Filipino descent
Filipino British sportspeople
British & Irish Lions rugby union players from the Philippines
British & Irish Lions rugby union players from England
Filipino expatriates in Singapore
Sportspeople from Manila